The Associação Brasileira de Preservação Ferroviária (ABPF) (Brazilian Association of Railway Preservation) is a non profit organization and was founded in 1977 by Frenchman Patrick Henri Ferdinand Dollinger, and brings together those interested in preserving and disseminating the history of Brazilian railroad. Fond of steam locomotives and railways, Patrick came to Brazil in 1966 and concerned with the abandonment of the Brazilian railway history, decided to create an entity preservation, similar to those existing in Europe and the United States.

In 1979 ABPF received from São Paulo state government the concession to use and operate a 24 km deactivated branch of Fepasa Railway in Campinas city. The society started the restoration of stations and tracks. Soon it started gathering rolling stock all around the country, that were borrowed by the government. This later became the Viação Ferrea Campinas Jaguariuna (Campinas Jaguariuna Railroad).

ABPF is split in several local chapters, known as regionals. The current chapters are:

 Regional de Campinas: responsible for the Viação Ferrea Campinas Jaguariuna
 Regional São Paulo: operates broad gauge steam train at São Paulo city and Paranapiacaba district 
 Regional Rio de Janeiro: keeps a small museum and a model railroad.
 Regional Santa Catarina: operates steam trains at Rio Negrinho, Piratuba and Apiúna.
 Regional Paraná: currently restoring rolling stock at Curitiba and planning an operation.
 Regional Sul de Minas: operates two steam trains, one at Passa Quatro MG and another at São Lourenço MG, also keeps a steam locomotive repair shop at Cruzeiro SP 

ABPF is the largest steam operator of heritage railways in Brazil.

Gallery

References

Rail transport preservation
Rail transport in Brazil